Jasenová is a village and municipality in Dolný Kubín District in the Zilina Region of northern Slovakia.
It has population of 401 people.

Its name comes from the Slovak word Jaseň, which is a kind of tree often found in the area. There is a church built in 1836 and an old elementary school from the 19th century. A hill named Choč (altitude 1611 m) can be seen from the village.

Famous people
Martin Kukučín, writer

See also
 List of municipalities and towns in Slovakia

References

Genealogical resources

The records for genealogical research are available at the state archive "Statny Archiv in Bytca, Slovakia"

 Roman Catholic church records (births/marriages/deaths): 1672-1898 (parish B)
 Lutheran church records (births/marriages/deaths): 1786-1949 (parish A)

External links
Surnames of living people in Jasenova

Villages and municipalities in Dolný Kubín District